Pholiota aurantioalbida is a species of agaric fungus in the family Strophariaceae. Found in Argentina, it was described as new to science by mycologist Rolf Singer in 1969.

See also
List of Pholiota species

References

External links

Fungi described in 1969
Fungi of Argentina
Strophariaceae
Taxa named by Rolf Singer